The 2013 Florida State Seminoles football team, variously Florida State or FSU, represented Florida State University in the sport of American football during the 2013 NCAA Division I FBS college football season. Florida State competed in the Football Bowl Subdivision (FBS) of the National Collegiate Athletic Association (NCAA). The Seminoles were led by fourth-year head coach Jimbo Fisher and played their home games at Bobby Bowden Field at Doak Campbell Stadium in Tallahassee, Florida. They were members of the Atlantic Coast Conference, and played in the Atlantic Division. It was the Seminoles' 22nd season as a member of the ACC and its ninth in the ACC Atlantic Division.

Led by eventual Heisman Trophy winner Jameis Winston, Florida State finished the season with a school-record fourteen wins and completed the school's third undefeated season. The Seminoles captured their seventeenth conference title and third national championship, earning the Grantland Rice Award, the MacArthur Trophy, the Associated Press Trophy and the AFCA National Championship Trophy.

In addition to the Heisman, Jameis Winston won the Walter Camp Award, the Davey O'Brien Award, and the Manning Award as well as being a finalist for the Maxwell Award and honored as the AP Player of the Year. Roberto Aguayo  won the Lou Groza Award as the nation's best placekicker, Bryan Stork won the Rimington Trophy awarded to the nation's top center. Ten players were named All-Americans, with three earning consensus honors. For their accomplishments, Lamarcus Joyner was a finalist for both the Jim Thorpe Award and the Nagurski Trophy, and  Coach Fisher was named the AFCA Coach of the Year and was a semifinalist for Maxwell Coach of the Year.

Twenty-six Seminoles from the national title team have gone on to play professional football with twenty-five players going on to play in the NFL, including four first round picks, and one player in the CFL. Nine players have been named consensus All-Americans. Since the National Championship, numerous players have gone on to win a Super Bowl including Bryan Stork, Tre' Jackson, Ronald Darby, Timmy Jernigan and Cameron Erving.

Previous season

Florida State ended the 2012 season, ranked #8 with a 12–2 record (7–1 in ACC play); they finished the season as champions of the ACC and BCS Orange Bowl champions. They were led by head coach Jimbo Fisher in his third year of head coaching. Eleven players from the 2012 team were taken in the 2013 NFL Draft.

Preseason
After the season, FSU lost six coaches from their coaching staff. Defensive coordinator Mark Stoops left his position at Florida State to take the job as head coach at Kentucky. D.J. Eliot left his position as defensive ends coach to assist Stoops at Kentucky as defensive coordinator. Eddie Gran, who served as runningback coach and special teams coordinator as well as associate head coach, also left the staff to serve as offensive coordinator at Cincinnati. Offensive coordinator James Coley left Florida State to take the same position at Miami. Greg Hudson, an assistant head coach left his position to become the defensive coordinator at Purdue. Quarterbacks coach Dameyune Craig left Florida State to return to Auburn, his alma mater.

Former Alabama assistant coach, Jeremy Pruitt, joined the Florida State staff as the new defensive coordinator, replacing Mark Stoops. Former Tennessee assistant coach Sal Sunseri was hired as defensive ends coach. Former Minnesota head coach Tim Brewster was hired as tight ends coach. Former South Carolina assistant coach Jimmy Graham was hired as runningbacks coach. Former Georgia Tech Defensive coordinator Charles Kelly was hired as linebackers coach and special teams. Randy Sanders was hired as quarterbacks coach.

Prior to the start of the season, wide receiver Greg Dent was suspended indefinitely following an arrest and subsequent charge of sexual battery. Just days later, Tight end transfer Kevin Haplea suffered a torn ACL during workouts, ruled to be out for the season. During the offseason, tight end Nick O'Leary (grandson of Jack Nicklaus) was involved in a motorcycle accident but recovered before the start of the season. Just before fall practice, tight end Christo Kourtzidis chose to transfer. At the start of fall practice, freshman tight end Jeremy Kerr suffered a knee cartilage tear leaving him sidelined for an undetermined amount of time. In August, wide receiver Willie Haulstead was released from the team after being named academically ineligible. Runningback Mario Pender was also declared ineligible due to academics. Jarred Haggins, a wide receiver, suffered a knee stress fracture in practice causing him to miss the season.

In the ACC Media Poll, Florida State was voted to finish second in the Atlantic Division. FSU led the league with six preseason All-ACC selections in Tre' Jackson, Bryan Stork, and James Wilder, Jr. on offense along with Timmy Jernigan, Christian Jones, and Lamarcus Joyner on defense.

Spring Game
The annual 'Garnet and Gold Game' was held on April 13 at Doak S. Campbell Stadium and the gold team was victorious, winning by a score of 40–24.

Personnel
This was head coach Jimbo Fisher's fourth year as the Seminole's head coach. During his previous three years with Florida State, he led the Seminoles to an overall record of 31 wins and 10 losses (31–10).

Jeremy Pruitt, a former assistant coach at Alabama, assumed the duties of defensive coordinator. Head coach Jimbo Fisher took over as offensive coordinator.

Coaching staff

Returning starters
For the 2013 season, Florida State had eight returning starters on offense, three on defense, and one on special teams.

Offense

Defense

Special teams

Media
Florida State football is broadcast on the Florida State University Seminoles Radio Network and the games are called by Gene Deckerhoff.

Rankings
	

*Source: ESPN.com: 2013 NCAA Football Rankings

Other preseason rankings for Florida State include:

 #15 – Athlon Sports
 #13 – Lindy's
 #3 – Phil Steele
 #16 – Dennis Dodd
 #13 – Barnhart (CBS Sports)
 #9 – Feldman (CBS Sports)
 #13 – Fowler (CBS Sports)
 #13 – Palm (CBS Sports)
 #7 – Fornelli (CBS Sports)
 #3 – Hinnen (CBS Sports)

 #11 – Patterson (CBS Sports)
 #10 – Tim Hyland
 #18 – Sporting News
 #12 – Sports Illustrated
 #14 – ESPN
 #17 – FOX Sports
 #14 – National Champs
 #12 – Lost Letterman
 #2 – College Football News
 #25 – College Football Universe

 #11 – ESPN Magazine
 #14 – Steve Helwagen
 #6 – CFB Matrix
 #10 – CapHeresy
 #8 – Pick Six
 #11 – Computer Ratings
 #14 – Arena Fanatic
 #5 – Mclllece Sports
 #12 – Clay Travis/Outkick the Coverage
 #11 – Bleacher Report
 #11 – FWAA

Statistics
The Seminoles ended the season as the highest-scoring team in college football history, surpassing the 2008 Oklahoma Sooners.

Scores by quarter (all opponents)

Scores by quarter (ACC opponents)

Schedule

Source:
 Denotes the largest crowd in Doak Campbell Stadium history

Game summaries

Pittsburgh

Sources:
  
    
    
    
    
    
    
    
    
    

Pittsburgh Leads Series: 5 – 3

Pregame Line: Florida St −10.5

On February 23, 2013, officials from both Florida State and Pittsburgh, as well as the commissioner of the Atlantic Coast Conference announced that the Seminoles and the Panthers would open the season at Heinz Field on Labor Day in what would be Pittsburgh's first game as a member of the ACC.

In the game that would serve as the debut of Jameis Winston as quarterback, the Seminoles had to overcome an early deficit to defeat the Panthers, 41–13. After Pitt scored on their first possession to take a touchdown lead, Florida State quickly responded on their first drive with a touchdown pass from Winston to Nick O'Leary to tie the game. Winston and O'Leary would connect twice more for touchdowns in a game where the offense rolled.

The first quarter would end with a tie game. Driving down the field, Florida State took their first lead of the game with another touchdown pass to Nick O'Leary. Pittsburgh was able to close the gap to four points after a twenty-eight yard field goal. The Seminoles would extend their lead with a rushing touchdown from Jameis Winston and a pass to Rashad Greene following an interception to give Florida State an eighteen-point lead at halftime. The third quarter was mostly uneventful with a pair of field goals from Florida State and a single field goal from Pittsburgh. The Seminoles held a three score lead going into the fourth quarter. Winston would add another touchdown in the final quarter.

Following Pitt's touchdown on the first drive, Florida State kept them out of the end zone for the remainder of the game and held the Panthers to just two field goals. After a slow start for the defense, Pitt was held to only 297 yards of offense and one touchdown.

For his four touchdown and 356 all-purpose yardage rookie performance, Winston was recognized as the Davey O'Brien Quarterback of the Week while tight end Nick O'Leary was named the John Mackey Tight End of the Week. The victory improved Florida State's all-time record against the Panthers to 4–5.

The game drew 4.5 million viewers and a 2.9 rating for ESPN, a three-year high for the network's Labor Day game. It was the third-most viewed game of college football's opening week.

Nevada

Sources:
  
    
    
    
    
    
    
    
    
    
    

Series Tied: 0 – 0

Pregame Line: Florida St −36

In their home opener, Florida State faced the Nevada Wolf Pack of the Mountain West Conference. After a slow start and another early deficit, the Seminoles would go on to defeat the Wolf Pack in dominating fashion, 62–7, after scoring 59 unanswered points.

The Seminoles would strike first courtesy of a field goal from Roberto Aguayo, which would serve as the only score of the first quarter. Going into the second quarter, the Seminoles held a three-point lead but they would eventually trail after Nevada scored the first touchdown of the game to take a four-point lead. However, this would be the only points allowed by the Seminole defense. Florida State scored touchdowns on two consecutive drives with two passes from quarterback Jameis Winston to Kenny Shaw and Rashad Greene to take a ten-point lead into the half.

Florida State rolled during the second half of the game, scoring thirty-one points in the third quarter and fourteen more points in the fourth quarter while holding Nevada scoreless.

Despite allowing a touchdown early in the game, the Florida State defense allowed only 214 yards while the Florida State offense tallied up 617 yards of total offense.

Winston continued to impress completing fifteen of his eighteen pass attempts with 214 yards, two passing touchdowns and one rushing touchdown. For his performance, he was named the ACC Rookie of the Week for the second consecutive week. Kicker Roberto Aguayo was also honored as the ACC Specialist of the Week after a game that saw him kick a career long field goal of 33 yards as well as make all eight extra-point attempts. The eight touchdowns were all scored by different players: Devonta Freeman, Ryan Green, Freddie Stevenson, James Wilder Jr., Karlos Williams (in his first start as running back), and Jameis Winston scored rushing touchdowns while Rashad Greene and Kenny Shaw scored the game's two receiving touchdowns.

Bethune–Cookman

Sources:
  
    
    
    
    
    
    
    
    
    

Series Tied: 0 – 0

Pregame Line: Lines are not released when an FCS team plays an FBS team.

In their third game of the season, Florida State defeated the Bethune–Cookman Wildcats on a rainy night in their first meeting by a final score of 54–6. Coming into this game, Florida State held a 19–0 record against teams from the Football Championship Subdivision.

Florida State jumped out to a quick lead by scoring the first 40 points of the game. Telvin Smith opened up the scoring for The Seminoles with an interception returned for a touchdown followed up by a 45-yard field goal from Roberto Auayo. A safety, caused by a penalty in the endzone by the Wildcats, gave the Seminoles an early twelve point lead. Florida State then scored three straight touchdowns courtesy of Kelvin Benjamin, James Wilder Jr., and Devonta Freeman to carry a thirty-three point lead into halftime.

Bethune–Cookman scored their first points at the start of the third quarter with a seven-yard touchdown run; they subsequently missed the extra point kick. Florida State would then score the final fourteen points of the game with two touchdown runs from newly converted RB Karlos Williams.

The defense allowed only 242 yards while the offense gained 492 total yards. Quarterback Jameis Winston completed 10 of 19 passes for 148 yards and two touchdowns. Running back Devonta Freeman led the team in rushing while wide receiver Kenny Shaw led the team in receiving.

Boston College

Sources:
  
   
    
    
    
    
    
    
    
    
    
    
    
    

Florida State Leads Series: 7 – 4

Pregame Line: Florida St −24

For their second road game of the season, the first since the season opener, Florida State hit the road to face the Boston College Eagles. In 2012, Florida State was victorious with a 51–7 win over the Eagles in Tallahassee. Florida State last traveled to Chestnut Hill in 2011 for a Thursday night match-up, a game the Seminoles won 38–7.

Florida State mounted a comeback to defeat Boston College, 48–34, in their second conference game of the season.

After stopping Florida State on their first offensive possession, Boston College took the early lead with a touchdown pass from BC quarterback Chase Rettig. Florida State responded with a seven play drive that ended in a field goal to cut the lead to four. The Eagles would then go on to score the next ten points of the game to take a fourteen-point lead and seemingly seize control of the game. However, the Seminoles rattled off twenty-one unanswered points including a "Hail Mary" pass, with no time remaining, at the end of the second quarter to take a seven-point lead at the half.

On the first drive of the second half, Boston College mustered up a drive that resulted in a field goal to close the gap and make it a four-point game. Florida State then completed two drives ending in touchdowns to take an eighteen-point lead. Boston College added another touchdown at the end of the third quarter. Entering the fourth quarter, Florida State held an eleven-point lead. In the final quarter, Florida State would extend their lead with a field goal. Boston College then began a promising drive, but P. J. Williams intercepted the ball and returned it for a touchdown to put the Noles up 48–27 late in the game. Boston College closed the gap with a touchdown to pull within two scores midway through the quarter. Florida State sealed the win with a late interception to take possession of the ball with less than two minutes remaining.

Although Boston College controlled the game early, Florida State outgained them with 489 yards of offense while limiting to Eagles to 397 total yards. Quarterback Jameis Winston completed 17 of 27 passes for 330 yards and four touchdowns. Winston also led the team in rushing with 14 rushes for 96 yards while wide receiver Kenny Shaw led the team in receiving with 4 receptions for 93 yards and one touchdown.

This was the 12th meeting between Florida State and Boston College, the 8th meeting as conference opponents. The victory improved Florida State's all-time record against the Eagles to 8–4.

Maryland

Sources:
   
   
    
    
    
    
    
    
    

Florida State Leads Series: 21 – 2

Pregame Line: Florida St −17.5

After a tough road game, the Seminoles returned home to face the Maryland Terrapins, who were ranked twenty-fifth in the nation coming into the game. In 2012, Florida State was victorious with a 41–14 win over the Terrapins in College Park, clinching the division in the process. In Maryland's last visit to Tallahassee in 2011, the Terps lost to the Seminoles by a score of 41–16. This game marked the final meeting between the teams as conference opponents as Maryland is leaving for the Big Ten Conference following the end of this season.

Florida State earned their first shutout of the season with a rout of Maryland, 63–0, setting a record for the most lop-sided victory against a ranked opponent in school history as well as the first shut-out of a ranked opponent in sixteen years.

Florida State struck first on offense and defense, forcing a three-and-out on the opening possession of the game and scoring a touchdown on their first possession. Maryland's defense held Florida State scoreless for the rest of the first quarter. However, Florida State would score another fourteen points in the second quarter courtesy of two five-yard touchdown runs from Devonta Freeman and Kelvin Benjamin. At halftime, Florida State held a 21–0 lead.

The Seminoles opened up the second half with another scoring drive capping off with an eight-yard pass from Jameis Winston to tight end Nick O'Leary to extend the lead to twenty eight. The second half was an offensive explosion for Florida State as the Seminoles went on a forty-two point scoring spree. With a twenty-one yard pass to Kenny Shaw and a twelve-yard pass to Nick O'Leary, Florida State carried a forty-two point lead into the final quarter. Florida State continued to score in the fourth with another twenty-one point quarter that consisted of touchdowns from Kelvin Benjamin and Karlos Williams along with backup QB Jacob Coker.

Florida State dominated the game with 614 yards of offense while the defense limited the Terrapins to only 234 total yards. Quarterback Jameis Winston completed 23 of 32 passes for 393 yards and five touchdowns and led the team in passing. Devonta Freeman led the team in rushing with 17 rushes for 63 yards while Rashad Greene led the team in receiving with 4 receptions for 108 yards.

This was the 24th and final meeting between Florida State and Maryland, the 22nd and last meeting as conference opponents. The victory improved Florida State's all-time record against the Terps to 22–2. The victory also improved Florida State's record against the Terps to 12–0 at Doak.

Clemson

Following a bye week, Florida State traveled to Clemson to face the Clemson Tigers in a top five matchup. In 2012, Florida State was victorious with a 49–37 comeback win over the Tigers in Tallahassee en route to an Atlantic Division title and an ACC Championship. Florida State last traveled to Death Valley in 2011, a game the Seminoles lost 35–30, furthering their win drought in Clemson, a place they have not won at since 2001. The winner of this game has represented the Atlantic Division in the ACC Championship Game for the past four years with Clemson winning the division title in 2009 and 2011 while Florida State won it in 2010 and 2012.

Under the lights (and with the attendance of College GameDay), Florida State stunned the third-ranked Clemson Tigers, 51–14, becoming the first team in history to score 50 points at Memorial Stadium.

Florida State struck early, capitalizing on a Clemson turnover on the first play from scrimmage. The Seminoles scored a touchdown on their third play as Winston threw a touchdown on his first pass of the game. Florida State added a field goal on their second series of the game. With a ten-point lead, Mario Edwards Jr. returned a fumble for a touchdown that put the Seminoles up 17–0. Clemson scored their first points of the game near the end of the first quarter with a touchdown pass from Tajh Boyd to Sammy Watkins to cut the lead back down to ten. Florida State doubled their lead with a touchdown and a field goal in the second quarter while Clemson failed to score. The Seminoles went into the half holding a twenty-point advantage.

Florida State continued to control the game in the second half, scoring twenty-four straight points, courtesy of a passing touchdown to Rashad Greene, rushing touchdowns from Devonta Freeman and Jameis Winston, and a field goal from Roberto Agauyo. Clemson would not make it into the endzone again until the end of the fourth quarter, securing a thirty-seven point win for the Noles.

Florida State amassed 565 yards of offense while the defense held the Tigers to 326 total yards and a season low 14 points. Quarterback Jameis Winston completed 22 of 34 passes for 444 yards and four touchdowns, three passing and one rushing, while leading the team in passing. Devonta Freeman led the team in rushing with 21 rushes for 84 yards while Nick O'Leary led the team in receiving with 5 receptions for 161 yards.

This was the 29th meeting between Florida State and Clemson, the 22nd meeting as conference opponents. The victory improved Florida State's all-time record against the Tigers to 19–8. With the win, Florida State became bowl eligible for the thirty-second consecutive year, the longest active streak in college football.

NC State

Sources:
  
    
    
    
    
    
    
    
    
    

Florida State Leads Series: 22 – 11

Pregame Line: Florida St −34.5

In a game that honored former head coach Bobby Bowden, Florida State faced the NC State Wolfpack. In 2012, Florida State was upset by the Wolfpack, 17–16, in Raleigh, giving the Seminoles their first loss of the season. When North Carolina State last traveled to Tallahassee in 2011, the Wolfpack were defeated by the Seminoles 34–0.

Florida State avenged last season's upset loss to NC State, riding on a huge first quarter to defeat the Wolfpack, 49–17.

The Seminoles took control of the game early, scoring the first thirty-five points. The first score of the game came from an 18-yard run from Karlos Williams following an interception by Brandon Mitchell. The next score came courtesy of a 39-yard touchdown pass from Jameis Winston to Kelvin Benjamin to give the Noles an early fourteen-point advantage. Devonta Freeman scored on an 11-yard rush for a touchdown. After a forced fumble by Terrence Brooks, Florida State converted the turnover into points with a 14-yard pass to Nick O'Leary. The Seminoles ended the first quarter with another receiving touchdown from Rashad Greene. The scoring continued in the second quarter when Devonta Freeman ran four yards for a touchdown. Florida State scored a total of 42 points in the first half while holding NC State scoreless.

NC State put their first points on the board in the third quarter by scoring ten unanswered points with a field goal and a 72-yard touchdown. The Wolfpack added seven more points in the fourth with another rushing touchdown. Florida State scored their final points of the game with a 31-yard rushing touchdown from Levonte Whitfield to secure the blowout win.

Florida State amassed 566 yards of offense, giving the Seminoles over 500 yards of offense for the fifth consecutive conference game, while the defense held the Wolfpack to 316 total yards. Quarterback Jameis Winston completed 16 of 26 passes for 292 yards and three touchdowns. Devonta Freeman led the team in rushing with 12 rushes for 92 yards and two touchdowns while Rashad Greene led the team in receiving with 8 receptions for 137 yards and a touchdown.

This was the 24th meeting between Florida State and NC State, the 22nd meeting as conference opponents. The victory improved Florida State's all-time record against the Wolfpack to 23–11.

Miami (FL)

Sources:
   
    
    
    
    
    
    
    

Miami Leads Series: 31 – 26

Pregame Line: Florida St −22

Following an emotional game, Florida State took on their rival, the Miami Hurricanes. In 2012, Florida State was victorious with a 33–20 win in Miami Gardens. Miami last traveled to Tallahassee in 2011, where the Hurricanes lost to the Seminoles 23–19 in a game dominated by questionable calls from the referees. College Gameday was on campus to witness the top ten clash, marking the tenth time that the program has visited campus and the twenty-sixth appearance for the school.

In front of a record crowd, Florida State defeated their rival for the fourth straight time, 41–14.

The Seminoles scored the first points on the opening drive of the game when Devonta Freeman ran the ball into the endzone to give Florida State an early seven-point lead. Miami then drove the ball down the field only to be stopped in the red zone; the Hurricanes then attempted a field goal that sailed wide left. As the Seminoles were once again going down the field, Jameis Winston threw his first interception of the season that led to a Miami touchdown five plays later to tie the game at 7. The first quarter ended in a tie game. Florida State responded by scoring the fourteen unanswered points courtesy of a rushing touchdown from James Wilder, Jr. and a receiving touchdown from Devonta Freeman. Looking to go up by more before the half, Jameis Winston made his second mistake of the game with an interception that led to another Miami score, to make the score 21–14 at halftime.

The Seminoles went on to dominate the second half, scoring twenty points while holding Miami scoreless. James Wilder, Jr. and Devonta Freeman each scored a touchdown in the third quarter to give Florida State a fourteen-point lead heading into the final quarter. In the fourth quarter, the Seminoles were held to two field goals from Roberto Aguayo, one with only a minute remaining, to secure the win over their rival.

Florida State amassed 517 yards of offense while the defense held the Hurricanes to 275 total yards and a season-low 14 points. Quarterback Jameis Winston completed 21 of 29 passes for 325 yards and one touchdown. Devonta Freeman led the team in both rushing and receiving with 23 carries for 78 yards and two touchdowns along with six receptions for 98 yards and one touchdown.

This was the 58th meeting between Florida State and Miami, the 8th meeting as conference opponents. The victory improved Florida State's all-time record against the Hurricanes to 27–31.

Wake Forest

Sources:
   
    
    
    
    
    
    
    
    
    

Florida State Leads Series: 24 – 6 – 1

Pregame Line: Florida St −35

Florida State traveled to face the Wake Forest Demon Deacons. In 2012, Florida State shutout the Demon Deacons, 52–0, in Tallahassee. When the Seminoles last traveled to Winston-Salem in 2011, they were upset by the Demon Deacons 35–30, part of a three-game skid for the Noles.

The defense totaled a school record seven turnovers in a rout of Wake Forest, 59-3.

After holding Wake Forest on the first drive of the game, Florida State scored on their first possession to take the lead. Following their opening drive, Terrence Smith intercepted Tanner Price's pass and set up Devonta Freeman to score on a one-yard touchdown run. Price was then picked off again by Mario Edwards Jr. to set up another rushing touchdown from Karlos Williams. In the second quarter, the Florida State defense continued their impressive performance when Nate Andrews returned an interception for a touchdown. On the next play, Jalen Ramsey returned a fumble for a touchdown. The offense put together another drive to go up by 42 points before halftime.

Another interception would lead to a touchdown at the start of the second half. A field goal extended the lead to 52 going into the final quarter. Wake Forest's only points of the game came courtesy of a field goal in the fourth. Florida State would add a score on special teams with a sixty-two yard punt return.

Florida State amassed 296 yards of offense, the lowest output of the season, while the defense held the Deacons to 166 total yards. Quarterback Jameis Winston completed 17 of 28 passes for 159 yards and two touchdowns, leading the team in passing. Karlos Williams led the team in rushing with 12 carries for 49 yards and a touchdown. Rashad Greene led the team in receiving with 5 receptions for 47 yards.

This was the 32nd meeting between Florida State and Wake Forest, the 22nd meeting as conference opponents. The victory improved Florida State's all-time record against the Demon Deacons to 25–6–1. With the win, Florida State claimed the division title and clinched a berth in the conference championship game.

Syracuse

Sources:
    
    
    
    
    
    
    
    
    
    

Florida State Leads Series: 5 – 1

Pregame Line: Florida St −38.5

In the final conference game of the year, Florida State faced the Syracuse Orange. The teams last met during the 2005 season in Tallahassee, a 38-14 win for the Seminoles.

On a day when the 1993 national title team was recognized to honor the twentieth anniversary of Florida State's first national championship, the Seminoles continued their own run by defeating Syracuse 59-3.

The Seminoles seized control of the game, scoring on the first drive of the game with a six-play drive culminating in a three-yard touchdown run from James Wilder, Jr. to put the Seminoles up early. Florida State went on to score on three straight possessions, with touchdown runs from Levonte Whitfield and Devonta Freeman and a touchdown throw from Jameis Winston to Rashad Greene, to put the Seminoles up by twenty-eight going into the second quarter. Florida State scored on their first possession in the second as well courtesy of a Jameis Winston pass to Kelvin Benjamin. The Seminoles extended their lead with a 53-yard field goal from Roberto Aguayo to go into halftime with a 38-0 lead.

To open the third quarter, Florida State forced Syracuse to punt. James Wilder, Jr. then ran for a touchdown to put the Seminoles up by forty-five. The Seminoles scored on their next possession with a seventeen-yard pass from Sean Maguire to Nick O'Leary. After forcing a fumble, Chris Casher returned the ball thirty-one yards for a touchdown. Going into the final quarter, the Seminoles held a fifty-nine point lead while the Orange had yet to score. Syracuse would get their first points of the game as a result of a ten-minute drive that ended in a field goal.
 With the clock ticking down, Florida State held Syracuse in the end zone to preserve a fifty-six point homecoming win.

Florida State amassed 523 yards of offense while the defense held the Orange to 247 total yards. Amid speculation of an alleged sexual assault, quarterback Jameis Winston completed 19 of 21 passes for 277 yards and two touchdowns, leading the team in passing; backup quarterback Sean Maguire, who played for much of the second half, also threw for a touchdown. Karlos Williams led the team in rushing with 4 carries for 78 yards. Kenny Shaw led the team in receiving with 7 receptions for 99 yards.

This was the 7th meeting between Florida State and Syracuse, the 1st meeting as conference opponents. The victory improved Florida State's all-time record against the Orange to 6–1. Florida State finished the season with an unbeaten conference record for the eighth time in school history, the first time since 2000.

Idaho

Sources:
    
    
    
    
    
    
    
    
    
    
    
    
   
    

Series Tied: 0 – 0

Pregame Line: Florida St −56

For their final home game of the season, Florida State faced the independent Idaho Vandals. In the first meeting between the two, Florida State set a school record for points scored with an 80-14 victory over the Vandals.

The Seminoles dominated the game from the start, scoring the game's first thirty-five points. Florida State's first score came courtesy of a rushing touchdown from Devonta Freeman. This was followed up by a touchdown run from Kelvin Benjamin. Telvin Smith returned an interception seventy-one yards for another touchdown to put the Noles up by three scores at the end of the first quarter. Florida State built on their lead in the second quarter with a passing touchdown from Jameis Winston to Kenny Shaw and a rushing touchdown from James Wilder, Jr. to give the Seminoles a commanding lead. Idaho got on the board with a ten-play drive that ended with a passing touchdown. In the final seconds of the first half, Florida State scored with a passing touchdown to Kenny Shaw. The Seminoles went into halftime, leading 42-7.

Florida State scored on the opening drive of the second half with a pass to Kelvin Benjamin. Karlos Williams rushed for a touchdown on the Seminole's next possession. A 42-yard field goal from Roberto Aguayo extended the lead going into the fourth. In the final quarter, Florida State scored two more touchdowns, a rush from Karlos Williams and a pass from backup Sean Maguire to Ryan Green. Idaho completed a nine-play drive that resulted in a touchdown as the game wound down.

Florida State amassed 645 yards of offense while the defense held the Vandals to 345 total yards. Quarterback Jameis Winston completed 14 of 25 passes for 225 yards and four touchdowns, leading the team in passing. Devonta Freeman led the team in rushing with 11 carries for 129 yards and one touchdown. Kenny Shaw led the team in receiving with 5 receptions for 107 yards and two touchdowns.

Florida

Sources:
    
    
    
    
    
    
    
    

Florida Leads Series: 34 – 21 – 2

Pregame Line: Florida St −27

Florida State traveled to Gainesville for their annual rivalry game with the Florida Gators, who were in the midst of their worst season since 1979, in the regular season finale. In 2012, Florida was victorious with a 37–26 win over the Seminoles in Tallahassee after Florida State blew a late lead. The Seminoles last traveled to Gainesville in 2011, where Florida State beat the Gators 21–7 in a turnover filled game.

In the final regular season game, Florida State defeated their archrival, 37-7, marking the Seminoles' third win in the last four games against the Gators.

The Seminoles started off sluggish against the Gators, scoring only three points in the first quarter. The offense was more productive in the second quarter, scoring their first touchdown of the game when Jameis Winston completed a 45-yd pass to Kelvin Benjamin to put them up by ten. Just before the half, Winston completed a 29-yd pass to Kelvin Benjamin for a touchdown to give the Noles a seventeen-point lead at halftime. Despite the offensive struggles, the defense held the Gators scoreless in the first half.

Early in the third quarter, Florida State capitalized on a Florida fumble, scoring three more points on a 40-yd field goal. Florida State extended their lead when Devonta Freeman rushed 11 yards for a touchdown to give the Seminoles a twenty-seven point advantage. Florida scored their first points of the game in the fourth quarter courtesy of a 5-yd pass from third-string quarterback Skyler Mornhinweg to Hunter Joyer. Florida State responded with a 4-yd pass from Winston to Benjamin. The final score of the game would come from Roberto Aguayo who kicked 28-yd field goal to give the Seminoles a thirty-point win over the rival Gators. Because of their victory over Florida, along with their earlier victory over Miami, the Seminoles were awarded the Florida Cup.

Florida State amassed 456 yards of offense while the defense held the Gators to 193 total yards. Quarterback Jameis Winston completed 19 of 31 passes for 327 yards and three touchdowns, leading the team in passing. James Wilder, Jr. led the team in rushing with 10 carries for 63 yards. Kelvin Benjamin led the team in receiving with 9 receptions for 212 yards and three touchdowns.

This was the 58th meeting between Florida State and Florida, making it one of the most-played rivalries in college football.
The victory improved Florida State's all-time record against the Gators to 22–34–2. Florida State also completed their first undefeated regular season since 1999.

ACC Championship: Duke

Sources:
    
    
    
    
    
    
    
    

Florida State Leads Series: 18 – 0

Pregame Line: Florida St −30

By virtue of winning the Atlantic Division, Florida State played in the ACC Championship Game in Charlotte. This marked the Seminoles' fourth appearance in the conference championship game and their fifth division title. Florida State's most recent appearance in the game came in 2012 when they won the conference title. The Seminoles faced the Coastal Division champion, the Duke Blue Devils.

The Seminoles won the ACC title, defeating the Blue Devils, 45-7, earning a spot to play in the BCS National Championship Game as the only undefeated team left in the country.

Florida State was held scoreless in the first quarter for the first time all season. The Seminoles scored the first points of the game with a fourteen-yard pass to Kelvin Benjamin to put the Noles up by a touchdown. After being forced to punt on their next possession, Florida State scored with a rushing touchdown from Karlos Williams. A field goal before the half put Florida State up by seventeen.

Florida State began to seize control of the game in the second half. An interception turned into points with a pass to Kenny Shaw. The Seminoles scored on their next drive courtesy of a pass to Kelvin Benjamin. Nate Andrews forced a fumble which the Seminoles converted into points when Winston rushed seventeen yards for a touchdown. In the fourth quarter, Devonta Freeman rushed for a touchdown while Duke scored their only points of the game in the final minute with a five-yard rushing touchdown.

Florida State amassed 569 yards of offense while the defense held the Blue Devils to 239 total yards. Quarterback Jameis Winston completed 19 of 32 passes for 330 yards and three touchdowns, leading the team in passing. Devonta Freeman led the team in rushing with 18 carries for 91 yards and a touchdown. Kelvin Benjamin led the team in receiving with 5 receptions for 119 yards and two touchdowns. 

This was the 19th meeting between Florida State and Duke. The victory improved Florida State's all-time record against the Blue Devils to 19–0.

BCS Championship: Auburn

Sources:
    
    
    
    
    
    
    
    
    
    
    

Auburn Leads Series: 13 – 4 – 1

Pregame Line: Florida St −8.5

In the national championship game, Florida State faced the Auburn Tigers, champions of the SEC.

The Seminoles captured their third national title by defeating Auburn, 34-31, at the Rose Bowl.

After Florida State scored a field goal on their first drive, Auburn responded with a touchdown in the first quarter and two in the second to storm out to a 21-3 lead. After a successful punt fake, the Seminoles managed a late touchdown before the half to go into the locker room down 21-10, marking the first halftime deficit of the season for the Seminoles.

Both teams dominated on defense in the third quarter with the Seminoles hitting a field goal to cut the lead to eight. In the fourth quarter, Florida State scored a touchdown early to make it a one-point game. After Auburn made a field goal, Kermit Whitfield returned the following kickoff 100 yards to give the Seminoles a three-point lead. Auburn answered with a touchdown to go up by four with just over a minute remaining. On their final drive of seven plays, Florida State scored a touchdown with thirteen seconds remaining, benefiting from a 49-yard completion to Rashad Greene to bring them into scoring position with less than a minute to play. The Seminoles emerged victorious to complete a perfect season and  end the SEC's streak of seven consecutive BCS titles.

Florida State amassed 385 yards of offense but was outgained by Auburn. The defense allowed 449 total yards with running back Tre Mason accounting for 195 yards. Despite an unproductive first half, quarterback Jameis Winston completed 20 of 35 passes for 237 yards and two touchdowns, leading the team in passing. Devonta Freeman led the team in rushing with 11 carries for 73 yards and a touchdown and also passed the 1,000 yard mark for the season. Rashad Greene led the team in receiving with 9 receptions for 147 yards.

This was the 19th meeting between Florida State and Auburn. The victory improved Florida State's all-time record against the Tigers to 5–13–1.

Awards

Heisman Trophy
Jameis Winston

Walter Camp Award
Jameis Winston

Davey O'Brien Award
Jameis Winston

Lou Groza Award
Roberto Aguayo

Rimington Trophy
Bryan Stork

Manning Award
Jameis Winston

Associated Press Player of the Year
Jameis Winston

AFCA Coach of the Year
Jimbo Fisher

Conference awards
Jacobs Blocking Trophy
Cameron Erving

ACC Rookie of the Year
Jameis Winston

 ACC Offensive Rookie of the Year
Jameis Winston

ACC Offensive Player of the Year
Jameis Winston

ACC Player of the Year
Jameis Winston

Watchlists
Lott Trophy
Lamarcus Joyner

 Rimington Trophy
Bryan Stork

Bednarik Award
Timmy Jernigan
Christian Jones
Lamarcus Joyner

John Mackey Award
Nick O'Leary

Outland Trophy
Cameron Erving
Tre Jackson
Timmy Jernigan
Bryan Stork

Nagurski Award
Timmy Jernigan
Christian Jones
Lamarcus Joyner

Jim Thorpe Award
Lamarcus Joyner

Butkus Award
Christian Jones
Telvin Smith

Lombardi Award
Tre Jackson
Timmy Jernigan
Christian Jones

Biletnikoff Award
Rashad Greene

Semifinalists
Players
Maxwell Award
Jameis Winston

 Bednarik Award
Lamarcus Joyner

 Lou Groza Award
Roberto Aguayo

 Davey O'Brien Award
Jameis Winston

 Walter Camp Award
Jameis Winston

 John Mackey Award
Nick O'Leary

 Outland Trophy
Bryan Stork

 Nagurski Trophy
Lamarcus Joyner

Coaches
Bear Bryant Award
Jimbo Fisher

 Maxwell Coach of the Year Award
Jimbo Fisher

Finalists
Players

 Maxwell Award
Jameis Winston

 Davey O'Brien Award
Jameis Winston

 John Mackey Award
Nick O'Leary

 Jim Thorpe Award
Lamarcus Joyner

 Lou Groza Award
Roberto Aguayo

 Manning Award
Jameis Winston

 Walter Camp Award
Jameis Winston

 Rimington Trophy
Bryan Stork

 Nagurski Trophy
Lamarcus Joyner

 Heisman Trophy
Jameis Winston

Coaches
Broyles Award
Jeremy Pruitt

Eddie Robinson Coach of the Year
Jimbo Fisher

Bobby Bowden Coach of the Year
Jimbo Fisher

Honors
 CFPA Freshman Performance of the Year
Jameis Winston

All-ACC
Seventeen players from Florida State were honored as All-ACC selections by the Atlantic Coast Sports Media Association:
First Team
Jameis Winston
Devonta Freeman
Rashad Greene
Cameron Erving
Tre' Jackson
Bryan Stork
Lamarcus Joyner
Second Team
Nick O'Leary
Timmy Jernigan
Telvin Smith
Christian Jones
Terrence Brooks
Roberto Aguayo
Third Team
Kelvin Benjamin
Josue Matías
Mario Edwards Jr.
Nate Andrews
Honorable Mentions
James Wilder Jr.
Kenny Shaw
Bobby Hart
Terrance Smith
P. J. Williams
Eighteen players from Florida State were also honored as All-ACC selections by the coaches:
First Team
Jameis Winston
Devonta Freeman
Rashad Greene
Cameron Erving
Tre' Jackson
Bryan Stork
Timmy Jernigan
Telvin Smith
Lamarcus Joyner
Terrence Brooks
Roberto Aguayo
Second Team
Kelvin Benjamin
Nick O'Leary
Josue Matías
Christian Jones
Third Team
Kenny Shaw
Mario Edwards Jr.
Honorable Mentions
Bobby Hart

All-Americans

Jameis Winston (consensus)
Cameron Erving
Lamarcus Joyner (consensus)
Roberto Aguayo
Timmy Jernigan
Bryan Stork (consensus)
Kelvin Benjamin
Tre' Jackson
Telvin Smith
Terrence Brooks

All-star games

NFL Draft selections
Twenty-three former players have been selected in the NFL Draft so far:

Sixteen former players signed as undrafted free agents:

Four former players have been chosen to go to the Pro Bowl:

ESPY Awards
In recognition of their season, Florida State was nominated for two ESPY Awards.

Roster

Depth chart

Recruits

Position key

References

External links
 Season statistics

Florida State
Florida State Seminoles football seasons
BCS National Champions
Atlantic Coast Conference football champion seasons
College football undefeated seasons
Florida State Seminoles football